The 1956 Tennessee A&I Tigers football team represented Tennessee Agricultural & Industrial State College as a member of the Midwest Athletic Association (MAA) during the 1956 NCAA College Division football season. In their second season under head coach Howard C. Gentry, the Tigers compiled a perfect 10–0 record, won the MAA championship, shut out five of ten opponents, and outscored all opponents by a total of 394 to 64. The team was also recognized as black college national champion.

The team was led by halfbacks Jesse Wilburn and Ray Mitchell, quarterback Robert Crawford, ends Don Taylor and Leon Jamison, and tackle Charles Gavin. Allowing only 25 points in nine regular season games, the team had the best scoring defense in the country.

Schedule

References

Tennessee A&I
Tennessee State Tigers football seasons
Black college football national champions
College football undefeated seasons
Tennessee A&I Football